The 1957 Oregon Webfoots represented the University of Oregon in the Pacific Coast Conference (PCC) during the 1957 NCAA University Division football season. Three home games were played on campus in Eugene at Hayward Field and three at Multnomah Stadium in Portland.

Led by seventh-year head coach Len Casanova, the Ducks were 7–3 in the regular season and 6–2 in the PCC, co-champions with rival Oregon State. Although the Beavers won the Civil War game in Eugene, the PCC had a no-repeat rule for the Rose Bowl, so the Ducks had clinched the berth the previous week with a win in Los Angeles over struggling USC.

In the Rose Bowl on New Year's Day, Oregon met Big Ten champion Ohio State (8–1), second-ranked and led by head coach Woody Hayes. The Buckeyes were ranked first in the UPI coaches poll and heavily favored, by up to twenty points, but needed a fourth quarter field goal to break a tie for a 10–7 win.

Outside the 27–26 win at Stanford, the Ducks did not allow more than thirteen points in their ten other games, which included two shutouts, and finished at 7–4.

Schedule

Roster

References

External links
 Official game program: Oregon at Washington State – October 19, 1957
 WSU Libraries: Game video – Oregon at Washington State – October 19, 1957

Oregon
Oregon Ducks football seasons
Pac-12 Conference football champion seasons
Oregon Webfoots football